Efraín Bu Girón (27 February 1924 – 2 August 2004) was a Honduran lawyer and politician from the Liberal Party of Honduras. He served as President of the National Congress of Honduras from 1982 to 1986. He was Minister of Finance of Honduras from 1986 to 1989.

References

1924 births
2004 deaths
Deputies of the National Congress of Honduras
20th-century Honduran lawyers
Liberal Party of Honduras politicians
People from Santa Bárbara Department, Honduras
Presidents of the National Congress of Honduras
Finance Ministers of Honduras